Danielle Eckhardt (born 1982), is an American painter, who is known primarily for her paintings on spirituality, surrealism and (PTSD). Her art work familiar to the community of Virginia Beach received wide coverage at various art exhibitions.

Eckhardt has headlined number of festivals and exhibitions across the Washington metropolitan area.

References

American surrealist artists
1982 births
Women surrealist artists
Artists from Virginia
People from Reston, Virginia
American contemporary painters
Living people
20th-century American women artists
Maryland Institute College of Art alumni
21st-century American women